This is a sortable list of characters and toys in the Beast Wars franchise, which is part of the larger Transformers franchise from Hasbro. This includes characters appearing in an animated series, comics or video games. This does not include characters only appearing in collector's club or convention-related comics (from 3H or Fun Publications), or toy-only characters. Appearances within the Beast Wars Sourcebook are not counted as appearances within IDW fiction for purposes of this table, as the Beast Wars Sourcebook was an attempt to include all characters from all Beast Wars fiction.

Using this table
Headings in this table are abbreviated to make the list more manageable. Meanings for the abbreviations are listed in the below key. Any entry that requires a more specific explanation has a footnote attached, the full text of which can be found in the notes section. Listings under "Toys" either link to the toy section of a character's article, or contain a list of related toys. By default, these lists are hidden, and can be displayed by clicking the link that says [show]. Entries with ? are placeholders for information that has not yet been added.

List

Beast Wars and Beast Machines characters
A list of characters who appeared in both the Beast Wars and Beast Machines show.

Introduced in Beast Wars

Maximals

Optimus Primal (Garry Chalk) is the commander of the Axalon crew and the main character of both Beast Wars and Beast Machines. Optimus starts off the series as a charismatic and competent but young and inexperienced leader. As the series goes on, he proves to be highly competent with a strict form of honor, though he is somewhat irreverent and is perfectly willing to bend the law. A running gag throughout the series is his penchant for stuffy and long speeches, something that Rattrap and even Megatron mock him for. In “Other Voices”, he goes on a risky mission to destroy the Vok Planet Buster. He succeeds, only to be killed thanks to a booby trap rigged by Megatron. However, in "The Coming of the Fuzors", Rhinox implants his spark in a blank protoform, reviving him in a Transmetal body. 

After Megatron fatally wounded Optimus Prime, threatening to erase the Maximals from existence, Optimus Primal takes his namesake’s spark into his body, transforming him into the highly powerful Optimal Optimus. During the finale, he attacks the Nemesis after it fires on and kills Tigerhawk, before boarding it and battling Megatron. He defeats Megatron, and he and the Maximals tie him to an Autobots shuttle. Before they depart the planet, Optimus memorializes his dead friends and declares the Beast Wars over. In Beast Machines, Optimus becomes a more spiritual character, seeing visions from and communicating with the Oracle. He slowly becomes fanatical, becoming convinced that he must make Cybertron completely organic, resulting in him and Cheetor coming into conflict multiple times.
 
Optimus is killed in a battle with Tankor and Megatron when he causes a storm of plasma energy. His spirit comes to the realization that he has become a fanatic and that his true purpose is to create a balance between the technological and the organic. After apologizing to his friends, Optimus chooses to remain on Cybertron rather than pass on, and is revived by the Oracle. Optimus then leads his companions on a quest to liberate the sparks Megatron had taken. After several failed attempts, he manipulates Megatron into allowing him to learn the location of the sparks. Optimus and the Maximals seemingly defeat Megatron, only for Megatron to return, leading his drones to extract the sparks of all except Optimus. Optimus battles Megatron, who absorbs the sparks of every Cybertronian and attempts to reformat Cybertron's core. Optimus distracts Megatron and knocks them both into the core, killing them but restoring the sparks to life. Optimus's spirit speaks to Cheetor one last time, before joining with the Matrix. His beast mode is a silverback gorilla.

Cheetor (Ian James Corlett) is an impulsive young rookie. He looks up to his elders but doesn't always follow their orders, and he frequently gets into trouble. He matures throughout the series from a typical teenager to a capable warrior, aided by his mutations into a Transmetal and then a Transmetal II form granting him greater strength. In Beast Machines, he is promoted to second-in-command after his suspicions about an organic tree being 'dangerous' to the Maximals' techno-organic beast modes prove correct, nearly causing Optimus, Blackarachnia and Rattrap to regress to their beast instincts. For a time Cheetor becomes the Maximals' military leader while Optimus becomes fixated on his new link to the Oracle, but Optimus eventually returns to his role as leader when he gains a better understanding of his mission. In the finale, it is strongly implied that Cheetor will become the new full-time leader after Optimus's death in the final battle. Cheetor's beast mode is a cheetah.

Rhinox (Richard Newman) is the tech expert of the Axalon crew, close friend of Optimus, and the second-in-command. Rhinox is highly skilled in combat but is highly spiritual and loves nature. He is highly intelligent as well, serving as the Maximal’s resident technician due to his tech-savvy nature. He primarily uses twin chainguns as weapons. In Beast Machines, Rhinox is captured by Megatron and has his spark used to power the Vehicon general Tankor. Rhinox's personality is brought to the forefront by Optimus, but his time as Tankor had corrupted his personality and caused him to embrace Megatron's plan for a purely technological Cybertron.

Rhinox decided that Megatron was unfit to carry out this plan and that he instead should be the one to do so. He began plotting against Megatron, intending to betray him. However, when Rhinox makes his final move and attempts to murder him, Megatron reveals he had programmed his generals to be unable to shoot him. Megatron shuts Rhinox off, and he is killed by plasma energy. Rhinox's spirit later approaches Optimus inside the Matrix, expressing regret for his misguided actions. His beast mode is a white rhinoceros.

Rattrap (Scott McNeil) is the hacker, saboteur, and demolitionist. He is cunning and resourceful, but sarcastic and querulous. Rattrap is cowardly, often proclaiming “We’re all gonna die!” whenever he is put in danger. However, he is actually highly brave, risking his life multiple times for his teammates. He develops an odd cross between a friendship and a rivalry with Dinobot, the two often bickering with each other, albeit sharing a mutual respect. After Dinobot’s betrayal, Rattrap is enraged and despises him for it, though he forgives Dinobot as he dies of his injuries. In Beast Machines, Rattrap is unable to transform after being reformatted for several episodes due to his frantic nature; when he does, he finds his body is far weaker, resulting in him developing insecurities over his perceived uselessness and his teammates' anger at him; however, his new body eventually proves useful due to its ability to hack into technology. He later develops a relationship with Botanica. His beast mode is a rat.

Dinobot (Scott McNeil) is a warrior and former Predacon turned Maximal. Dinobot joined the Maximals after he attempted a failed coup against Megatron, believing they had crash landed on a random planet. Dinobot values pride and honor above all else, sticking to a strict code of ethics. Dinobot's abrasive personality often leads to conflict with the other Maximals, particularly Rattrap; the two develop a strange cross between a rivalry and a friendship, often arguing with each other. After discovering the Golden Disks, Dinobot begins to wonder if the future can be changed or is set in stone, triggering an existential crisis that leads to him betraying the Maximals to Megatron temporarily. Dinobot discovers that the future can be changed after watching Megatron destroy a mountain, changing an image of it to match its current star; realizing Megatron intends to wipe out the early humans, Dinobot battles the Predacons to prevent this. Dinobot succeeds, but is mortally wounded in the process, and dies shortly after the other Maximals arrive. His beast mode is a Velociraptor.

Tigerhawk (Blu Mankuma) is a fusion of Tigatron and Airazor. His beast mode is a white tiger/falcon hybrid, resembling a white tiger with wings.
Tigatron (Blu Mankuma) is a Maximal whose stasis pod was damaged, leaving him in an amnesiac state until he remembered his true allegiance after watching Megatron threaten the white tiger he had scanned. Tigatron serves as a scout, preferring to operate and live in the wilderness, though he still often aids the Maximals. He temporarily becomes a neutral party after inadvertently killing Snowstalker, a white tiger he had befriended, in a battle, though he returns to the Maximals after he realizes the Predacons would likely lay ravage to the wilderness. At the beginning of Season 2, he and Airazor go off to scout for stasis pods knocked out of orbit by the destruction of the Vok super weapon, and the two form a romantic relationship. However, the two are abducted by a Vok weapon that teleports them to the Voke homeworld, where they are merged into Tigerhawk. Tigerhawk rejoins the Maximals shortly before the end of Beast Wars, but dies in the finale, killed by Megatron using the Nemesis. Tigatron's beast mode is a white Siberian tiger.
Airazor (Pauline Newstone) is a female Maximal and scout, who works closely with Tigatron and shares his fondness for Earth's beauty. Her beast mode is a peregrine falcon.

Silverbolt (Scott McNeil) is a knight and has a chivalrous personality to match. His reluctance to ever hurt a female leads him to refuse fighting Blackarachnia; eventually, the two devellop a romance and fall in love. He is a fuzor. His beast mode in Beast Wars is a wolf with the wings, tail feathers, and legs of an eagle. His beast mode in Beast Machines is a condor.

Depth Charge (David Sobolov) is a former security officer turned vigilante. He operates independently to hunt down and properly execute the criminal turned Predacon, Rampage, who had killed everyone in the colony Depth Charge had been assigned to protect. Depth Charge captured Rampage and brought him in. Believing Optimus would fail at transporting him, he followed them, winding up on prehistoric Earth with a Transmetal body. Depth Charge often works separately from the other Maximals and clashes with them, instead concentrating on hunting Rampage, though he often does wind up appearing to aid in the middle of a battle. In the series finale, he is sent to stop Megatron from activating the Nemesis. Rampage attacks him, and the two battle; ultimately, Depth Charge impales Rampage's spark with a piece of raw energon, causing a massive explosion that kills them both. His beast mode is a manta ray, capable of flight above the surface.

Predacons
Megatron (David Kaye) is the ruthless leader of the Darksyde crew of Predacons and the main antagonist of both Beast Wars and Beast Machines. He inherited his name from the original Decepticon leader from Generation 1, and travels back in time after stealing the golden disk in an attempt to rewrite history so that his Decepticon ancestors will win the Great War against the Autobots, thereby ensuring the Predacons' supremacy. Megatron's original beast mode is a purple Tyrannosaurus rex but he later upgrades into a red European dragon after stealing his namesake's spark.

Waspinator (Scott McNeil) is a dim-witted aerial fighter and comic relief who is often abused by both his fellow Predacons and the Maximals. He almost always refers to himself in the third person and blisters under his bad luck. His beast mode is a green and yellow wasp. 

Tarantulas (Alec Willows) is the treacherous and sadistic Predacon scientist on Megatron's crew who is later revealed to be a spy for the Tripedacus Council, thereby making him a descendant of Unicron. Tarantulas often schemes against Megatron and hatches his own plans to destroy the Ark to erase both the Autobots and Decepticons, and thus the Maximals and Predacons, from existence. He despises the extraterrestrial Vok and attempts to eradicate them on numerous occasions. His beast mode is a purple tarantula.

Terrorsaur (Doug Parker) is an ambitious and power-hungry aerial fighter who openly wishes to usurp Megatron as leader of the Predacons. He makes numerous attempts to overthrow Megatron throughout the series, and on two occasions managed to successfully depose Megatron. However, he proved an incompetent leader. During the season 2 premiere, he is killed during the quantum surge. His beast mode is a generic pterosaur, which erroneously is toothed.

Scorponok (Don Brown) is Megatron's loyal but unintelligent second-in-command. In spite of his idiocy, Scorponok is actually highly tech-savvy, developing weapons for the Predacons. On occasion, however, these weapons backfire spectacularly. Scorponok dies in the season 2 premiere, when the quantum surge causes him and Terrorsaur to fall into a pit of lava. His beast mode is a black scorpion.

Blackarachnia (Venus Terzo) is a female Predacon, who later defects to the Maximals. Her selfishness and desire to preserve her own life ironically placed her on the side of the Maximals, as she was unwilling to sacrifice her existence for Megatron's ambition. She falls in love with Silverbolt, which eventually leads her to fully leave the Predacons to join the Maximals. Her beast mode is a black widow spider.

Inferno (Jim Byrnes) was a blank protoform who received damage landing on Earth, and went insane, gaining the mentality of an army ant: aggressive, obedient, and loyal to the colony (his stasis pod), as well as making him violent and homicidal. He was defeated by Tigatron, who destroyed his stasis pod, but Megatron reprogrammed Inferno to view Megatron as the queen of his colony. Inferno exhibits symptoms of pyromania, taking great joy in using his flamethrower to burn things, and is fanatically loyal to Megatron, willing to lose his own life to aid Megatron and killing anyone Megatron orders him to. This results in him being promoted to Megatron’s second-in-command after the death of Scorponok. Ironically, he is inadvertently killed by Megatron in the series finale when he is caught in the crossfire of the Nemesis fusion cannon. His beast mode is a fire ant.

Quickstrike (Colin Murdoch) is an aggressive and highly violent sociopath who is obsessed with fighting and speaks with a Texan accent. Quickstrike and Silverbolt were both Maximal protoforms whose stasis pods malfunctioned and turned them into Fuzors, Transformers with the ability to transform into hybrid beast modes. Quickstrike quickly fell in with the Predacons due to his violent personality, and stuck with them even after Silverbolt defected. Quickstrike is highly impulsive, making him easily manipulated. Blackarachnia and Tarantulas exploit this to convince him to aid in their plans to overthrow Megatron. In the third season, Tarantulas has Quickstrike attempt to murder Megatron by pushing him into a pit of lava. Megatron survives and attempts to execute Quickstrike, only to pardon him and allow him back into the Predacon forces after Tigerhawk arrives. In the series finale, Quickstrike and Inferno are killed when they are caught in the crossfire of the Nemesis when Megatron has it blast the primitive humans' settlement. He is a fuzor, and his beast mode is a scorpion with a cobra for a tail.

Rampage/Protoform X (Campbell Lane) was created by a Maximal experiment to recreate Starscream’s immortal spark; while he became nigh invulnerable, he was also left in constant pain, driving him insane and causing him to become a violent serial killer. He went on a killing spree, wiping out multiple colonies before being captured by Depth Charge and put into stasis. He was placed aboard the Axalon, to be dumped on a barren planet, only for Protoform X to be ejected during the fight with the Darksyde at the beginning of the series. 

He eventually revives after his stasis pod falls out of orbit and goes on a rampage, attacking Maximals and Predacons alike until he is defeated by Silverbolt. Megatron captures him and tears out half of his spark, using it to keep him under his control, and renames him Rampage. Rampage is clearly angry with this arrangement, frequently expressing his hatred for Megatron and occasionally threatening him. In “Transmutate”, a more sympathetic side of Rampage is shown when he meets the titular character, a deformed and simpleminded Transformer, befriending it and talking Megatron out of executing it and into allowing it to join the Predacons. Ultimately, Transmutate is destroyed while stopping Rampage and Silverbolt, both of whom it had bonded with, from killing each other. Rampage is grief-stricken, and allows the Maximals to leave without a fight. 

In the third season, Depth Charge arrives on Earth to hunt down Rampage, who is delighted by this and the opportunity for revenge. The two fight numerous times over the course of the series, Rampage always narrowly escaping from death. Megatron uses his half of Rampage’s spark to create Dinobot II, who willingly inflicts damage upon the spark to keep Rampage in line. In the series finale, Rampage attacks Depth Charge while he tries to destroy the Nemesis. The two battle once again; ultimately, a cackling Rampage allows Depth Charge to impale him with a shard of raw energon, causing a massive explosion that kills them both. His beast mode is a giant crab, which also has a tank mode.

Dinobot II (Scott McNeil) is a clone of the original Dinobot in Transmetal 2 form. He possesses half of the spark of Rampage, given by Megatron to make sure Rampage is under control. Unlike the original Dinobot, he blindly follows Megatron, never challenging orders; however, in the Beast Wars finale, the death of Rampage causes him to retake the personality of the original Dinobot and rebel against Megatron, saving the Maximals and the future. However, he dies in the explosion of the Nemesis after biding Optimus Primal a final farewell.

Introduced in Beast Machines

Maximals
Nightscream (Alessandro Juliani) is an urban youth who never left Cybertron. He survived on his own during the Vehicon invasion, until he was found by Optimus. His beast mode is a bat. 

Noble/Savage is an organism that changes between a werewolf and a fire-breathing dragon. It was unintentionally created and possessed by Megatron when he tried to purge his own beast mode. After being abandoned by Megatron, the creature continued to live in an animal-like state, forming a bond with Nightscream, similar to that of a boy and his dog. Noble is killed defending Nightscream from Megatron.

Botanica (Kathleen Barr) is a scientist and botanist and the only survivor of her own exploration crew. She transforms into an alien plant, making her the only Maximal whose beast mode is not actually a beast.

Vehicons
Obsidian (Paul Dobson) and Strika (Patricia Drake) are a pair of Vehicon generals who once were Autobots. Although reputed and proven to be the most intelligent military tacticians in history, they had limited moral judgement and were fatally obedient to whoever is in power, thus making them allied to Megatron, who had successfully taken over Cybertron at the time. 

Jetstorm (Brian Drummond) is a psychopathic Vehicon general, who commands the aerial drones. He was the brainwashed spark of Silverbolt. 

Thrust (Jim Byrnes) is a suave Vehicon general, who commands the cycle drones. He was the brainwashed spark of Waspinator.

Tankor (Paul Dobson) is the brutish Vehicon general of the tank drones. He was the brainwashed spark of Rhinox. After breaking free from Megatron's control, the corrupted Rhinox embraced his new name and vehicle form, and planned on usurping Megatron as the ruler of Cybertron. 

Diagnostic Drones, appearing in Beast Machines, appear as servants of Megatron.

See also
 List of Beast Wars II Characters
 List of Beast Wars Neo Characters

Explanatory notes

References

|-
|
|
|
|
|
|
|
|
|
|
|
|
|
|
|

Lists of anime and manga characters
Lists of toy characters
Lists of Transformers characters
Characters
Lists of characters in American television animation by series
Lists of characters in Canadian television animation